The Pinon Range is a north–south trending range in western Elko County, Nevada in the Great Basin region of the western United States.

Notes

Mountain ranges of Nevada
Mountain ranges of Elko County, Nevada